-hou or hou is a place-name element found commonly in the Norman toponymy of the Channel Islands and continental Normandy.

Etymology and signification 
Its etymology and meaning are disputed, but most specialists think it comes from Saxon or Anglo-Saxon hōh "heel", sometimes hō, then "heel-shaped promontory", "rocky steep slope", "steep shore". This toponymic appellative appears as a final -hou or associated with the Romance definite article le Hou. It can be found everywhere in Normandy, but more in the western part of it.

The English toponymy uses this Saxon or Anglo-Saxon element the same way, but its result is phonetically -hoo or -hoe, sometimes -(h)ow or -ho  e. g. :  Northoo (Suffolk); Poddinghoo (Worcestershire); Millhoo (Essex); Fingringhoe (Essex); Rainow (Cheshire); Soho (London); etc. As an independent element it is Hoe, Hoo, Hooe, Ho or the Hoe, e.g. the Hoe at Plymouth (Dorset) above the harbour.

In Normandy, it may have sometimes mixed up with Old Norse hólmr, meaning a small island, and often found anglicised elsewhere as "holm". It can still be found in modern Scandinavian languages, e.g. Stockholm. The normal evolution of hólmr in Normandy is -homme, -houme, even -onne at the end of a toponym and le Homme, le Houlme, le Hom with the article. The Norman toponym and diminutive hommet / houmet also derives from this element.

In Parisian French, the equivalent is îlot, which is cognate with the English "islet".

Channel Islands

Bailiwick of Guernsey

 Off Guernsey
 Lihou
 Off Alderney
 Burhou
 Off Herm
 Jethou
 Off Sark
 Brecqhou

Bailiwick of Jersey

 Les Écréhous
 La Rocco (from rocque-hou)
 Icho (from ic-hou)

Continental Normandy

-hou 
Manche
Bléhou, hamlet at Sainteny.
Bunehou, hamlet and manor at Saint-Germain-le-Gaillard.
Ingrehou, hamlet at Saint-Sauveur-de-Pierrepont.
Cap Lihou, à Granville
Néhou, hamlet at Auvers.
Nehou, hamlet at Gatteville-le-Phare.
Primehou, hamlet at Nay.
 Tatihou
 Quettehou
 Néhou
 Tribehou
Eure
Quatre-houx (Catehou 1174, Cathoux without date), hamlet at le Noyer-en-Ouche
Seine-Maritime
Le Conihout (Conihou end of the 12th century), hamlet at le Mesnil-sous-Jumièges

Variant form Ho- / Hau- 
Hotot
Hautot
See Huttoft, England

Notes

References
 Noms de lieux de Normandie, René Lepelley, 1999 Paris 
Jersey Place Names, Stevens, Arthur & Stevens, 1986 Jersey 

Norman language
Channel Islands
Jersey
Place name element etymologies
English suffixes